Abdelghani Mouaoui (born 22 February 1989) is a Moroccan footballer who plays as a forward.

International career

International goals
Scores and results list Morocco's goal tally first.

Honours 
Wydad Casablanca
Winner
 Botola: 2014–15

Runner-up
 CAF Champions League: 2011

References

External links 
 

1989 births
Living people
Moroccan footballers
Morocco international footballers
Association football forwards
Wydad AC players
Chabab Rif Al Hoceima players
Olympic Club de Safi players
Ittihad Tanger players
Moroccan expatriate footballers
Expatriate footballers in the United Arab Emirates
Moroccan expatriate sportspeople in the United Arab Emirates
Emirates Club players
UAE Pro League players
AS FAR (football) players
2016 African Nations Championship players
Morocco A' international footballers